Larry Fink (born March 11, 1941) is an American photographer best known for his black-and-white images of people at parties and in other social situations.

Life and career 
Fink was born in 1941 in Brooklyn, New York. His father, Bernard Fink, was a lawyer, and mother, Sylvia Caplan Fink, was an anti-nuclear weapon activist and an elder rights activist for the Gray Panthers. His younger sister was noted lawyer Elizabeth Fink (1945–2015). He grew up in a politically conscious household and has described himself as "a Marxist from Long Island." He studied at the New School for Social Research in New York City, where photographer Lisette Model was one of his teachers and encouraged his work.

He has been on the faculty of Bard College since 1986. Earlier he taught at other institutions including the Yale University School of Art (1977–1978), Cooper Union School of Art and Architecture (1978–1983), Parsons School of Design, and New York University.

Larry Fink left his longtime photography agency Bill Charles Represents on May 23, 2012.

Works 
Fink's best-known work is Social Graces, a series of photographs he produced in the 1970s that depicted and contrasted wealthy Manhattanites at fashionable clubs and social events alongside working-class people from rural Pennsylvania participating in events such as high school graduations. Social Graces was the subject of a solo exhibition at the Museum of Modern Art in 1979 and was published in book form in 1984. A New York Times reviewer described the series as exploring social class by comparing "two radically divergent worlds", while accomplishing "one of the things that straight photography does best: provid[ing] excruciatingly intimate glimpses of real people and their all-too-fallibly-human lives."

In 2001, for an assignment from The New York Times Magazine, Fink created a series of satirical color images of President George W. Bush and his cabinet (portrayed by stand-ins) in scenes of decadent revelry modeled on paintings by Weimar-era painters Max Beckmann, Otto Dix and George Grosz. The planned publication of the series was canceled after the September 11 attacks, but was displayed in the summer of 2004 at the PowerHouse Gallery in New York, in a show titled "The Forbidden Pictures: A Political Tableau."

Awards and honors 
Fink was the recipient of Guggenheim Fellowships in 1976 and 1979 and National Endowment for the Arts Individual Photography Fellowships in 1978 and 1986. In 2002 he received an honorary doctorate from the College for Creative Studies in Detroit.

Publications

 Photographs. San Francisco: San Francisco Museum of Modern Art, 1981. Booklet accompanying an exhibition by Fink and Joel Sternfeld.
 Ist Fotografie Kunst? Gehört Fotografie ins Museum? "Internationales Fotosymposion 1981, Schloss Mickeln bei Düsseldorf." Munich: Mahnert-Lueg, 1982. . Contribution by Fink.
 Social Graces. Millerton, New York: Aperture, 1984.  (clothbound);  (collectors' edition);  (softcover).
 Social Graces. New York: PowerHouse, 1999.  (regular edition);  (limited edition). Larger format and redesigned, with an introductory text (first published in 1979) by Max Kozloff.
 Focus Santa Barbara. Santa Barbara, CA: Santa Barbara Contemporary Arts Forum, 1985. Catalogue for an exhibition, September–October 1985, by Fink, Walter Cotton, Lee Friedlander, Mary Ellen Mark, Richard Misrach, and Richard Ross.
 Pleasures and Terrors of Domestic Comfort. New York: The Museum of Modern Art, 1991. Edited by Peter Galassi, contribution by Fink.
 Still Working: Underknown Artists of Age in America. [New York]: Parsons School of Design, New York, 1994. . Edited by Stewart Shedletsky; photographs by Fink; essays by Ann Gibson.
 Waking the Wood: Martha Posner: January 19 through March 2, 1995. Allentown, PA: Frank Martin Gallery, Baker Center for the Arts, Muhlenberg College, [1995].  Booklet with an introduction and photographs by Larry Fink, essay by J.M. Welker.
 Uma cidade assim. Matosinhos: Câmara Municipal de Matosinhos, 1996. . Photographs by Fink and Bruno Sequeira.
 Boxing. New York: PowerHouse, 1997.  (regular edition);  (limited edition). By Fink. Introduction by Andy Grundberg; essay by Bert Randolph Sugar.
 Fish and Wine: Larry Fink's Photographs of Portugal. Easton, PA: Lafayette College, Art Gallery, Williams Center for the Arts, 1997. . Booklet to accompany an exhibition held in September 1997 at Lafayette College, Easton, Pennsylvania, and October–November 1997 at Gateway Center IV, Newark, New Jersey. With an essay by George E. Panichas.
 Rent. New York: William Morrow, 1997. . About the musical Rent; by Jonathan Larson et al.; photography by Fink and Stewart Ferebee.
 Ellis Island: Echoes from a Nation's Past. New York: Aperture, 1997. . With photographs by Fink and others.
 Runway. New York: PowerHouse, 1999.  (regular edition);  (limited edition). By Fink, with an introduction by Guy Trebay.
 A City Seen: Photographs from the George Gund Foundation Collection. Cleveland: The Cleveland Museum of Art, 2002. . Contribution by Fink.
 The Forbidden Pictures: Photographs. New York: PowerHouse, 2004. . Twelve photographs by Fink, with texts by Fink and others.
 Woolrich Roadtrip 2004, New York, NY to Woolrich, PA. Woolrich, PA: Woolrich, 2004.
 Larry Fink. Phaidon 55. London: Phaidon, 2005. . By Laurie Dahlberg.
 Primal Elegance. Portfolio Book Series, no. 6. Revere, PA: Lodima, 2005. . Edition of 1000. Fourteen photographs by Fink of mantises.
 Somewhere There's Music. Bologna: Damiani, 2006. ; . By Fink, with an essay by George E. Panichas.
 Cleveland Clinic: Two Views. Cleveland: Cleveland Clinic, 2006. . Photographs by Fink and Andrew Moore.
 Effetto Luce. Florence: Luce della Vite, 2007. The publisher's description: "In 2007 Luce della Vite, the Montalcino wine producer hosted an gala event with international media and guests, including celebrities from the worlds of entertainment, fashion, wine and business, arrive in Florence to celebrate launch of new Luce wine at the prestigious Villa i Collazzi in Florence on Saturday night and photographer Larry Fink captured the most significant moments of the Effetto Luce evening."
 Night at the Met. N.p. Fotovision, 2009. Photographs by Fink of the Metropolitan Museum of Art.
 The Vanities: Hollywood Parties 2000–2009: Photographs. Munich: Schirmer/Mosel, 2011. . By Fink, with essays by Lucy Sante and Ash Carter, text in English and German.
 Larry Fink: Attraction and Desire: 50 Years in Photography. Saint Louis, MO: The Sheldon Art Galleries, [2011]. . Accompanying an exhibition at the Sheldon Art Galleries, February–May 2011. With an essay by Olivia Lahs-Gonzales.
 Contatti. Provini d'Autore = Choosing the best photo by using the contact sheet. Vol. I. Edited by Giammaria De Gasperis. Rome: Postcart, 2012. . Contribution by Fink.
 Larry Fink on Composition and Improvisation. New York: Aperture, 2014. . With an introduction by Lisa Kereszi.
 The Beats. Brooklyn, NY: PowerHouse, 2014. . Photographs by Fink of the beats, with an essay and poem by Gerald Stern and an essay by Robert Cordier.
 Kindred Spirits. Minor Matters, 2014. By Fink, with an essay by Peter Barberie.
 Opening the Sky. London: Stanley Barker, 2015. .

Notes

References

External links 
 Larry Fink Photography
 Larry Fink on artnet Monographs

1941 births
Living people
American photographers
Photography academics
Writers on photographic techniques
Bard College faculty
People from Brooklyn
Vanity Fair (magazine) people